Chad competed at the 2019 African Games held from 19 to 31 August 2019 in Rabat, Morocco. In total, four bronze medals were won and the country finished 36th in the medal table.

Medal summary

Medal table 

|  style="text-align:left; width:78%; vertical-align:top;"|

|  style="text-align:left; width:22%; vertical-align:top;"|

Archery 

Marlyse Hourtou competed at the 2019 African Games. In total, six athletes represented Chad in archery: Alexandre Danzabe, Madaye Israel Jacques Romno, Marlyse Hourtou, Aron Salome Atchoumgai and Martine Abaifouta Hallas Maria.

They won the bronze medal in the mixed team event and also in the women's team event.

Athletics 

Athletes representing Chad competed in several athletics events.

Mabrouk Matar competed in the men's 100 metres event. He finished in 46th place in the heats. He also competed in the men's 200 metres event and finished in 39th place in the heats.

Abbangah Brahim Zenaba competed in the women's 100 metres and women's 200 metres events and she finished in the 41st and 40th place in the heats respectively.

Bachir Ahmat Mahamat finished in 38th place in the heats in the men's 400 metres event.

Ali Hisseine Mahamat was scheduled to compete in the men's 1500 metres event but he did not start.

Valentin Betoudji finished in 17th place in the men's half marathon with a time of 1:10:44.

Koutou Madjou finished in 14th place in the women's half marathon.

Boxing 

Four athletes competed in boxing: Stephane Djedouboum (men's 69kg), Noel Lucas Justin (men's 81kg), Bambo Rodrigue (men's 75kg) and Anmon Olivier Yankim (men's 63kg).

Judo 

Gedeon Daniella, Sani Ibrahim Issa, Demos Memneloum, Chancella Mianbigue, Hissein Ramadane Omar Haroun Ramadan Ramadan and Hissein Ramadan Youssouf represented Chad in judo.

Memneloum won the bronze medal in the women's −70 kg event.

Karate 

Ten athletes representing Chad competed in karate. No medals were won. The competitors were Kesse Toudja, Serferbe Yvette Sob Hinka, Gag Grace, Houmaizou Maina Merci, Armel Djimbaye, Francis Ndamian, Mahmoud Al Hadj Issa, Gamo Cyrille, Echa Souleymane Ayi, and Victorine Koro.

Table tennis 

Chad competed in table tennis.

Idriss Allatchi Brahim, Adeline Djimet Koubia and Vanessa Ndoredje competed in table tennis.

Taekwondo 

Chad competed in Taekwondo. Casimir Betel won the bronze medal in the men's –58 kg event.

Wrestling 

Six athletes represented Chad in wrestling.

Men's freestyle

Men's Greco-Roman

Women's freestyle

References 

Nations at the 2019 African Games
2019
African Games